Christopher James Mazza (born October 17, 1989) is an American professional baseball pitcher for the Saraperos de Saltillo of the Mexican League. He has played in Major League Baseball (MLB) for the New York Mets, Boston Red Sox, and Tampa Bay Rays.

Career
Mazza attended Clayton Valley High School in Concord, California. He attended Menlo College in Atherton, California.

Minnesota Twins
Mazza was drafted by the Minnesota Twins in the 27th round of the 2011 MLB draft. He became the first player ever drafted out of Menlo College. Mazza spent time in the Twins organization from 2011 to 2015. During his time with them, he played for the GCL Twins, Elizabethton Twins, and Cedar Rapids Kernels. He was released by the Twins on July 22, 2015.

Miami Marlins
Mazza signed a minor league contract with the Miami Marlins on August 4, 2015. While in the Miami organization, he played for the GCL Marlins, Jupiter Hammerheads, Jacksonville Suns, Jacksonville Jumbo Shrimp, and New Orleans Baby Cakes. He was released by the Marlins on May 19, 2018.

San Rafael Pacifics
After being released by Miami, Mazza signed with the San Rafael Pacifics of the Pacific Association.

Southern Maryland Blue Crabs
On July 13, 2018, Mazza signed a contract with the Southern Maryland Blue Crabs of the Atlantic League.

Seattle Mariners
On August 17, 2018, Mazza was signed by the Seattle Mariners, and was assigned to the Arkansas Travelers for the remainder of the season.

New York Mets
On December 13, 2018, Mazza was selected by the New York Mets in the Triple-A phase of the 2018 Rule 5 draft.

Mazza opened the 2019 season playing for the Binghamton Rumble Ponies and the Syracuse Mets. On June 26, Mazza's contract was selected and he was called up to the major leagues for the first time. He made his major league debut on June 29 against the Atlanta Braves, pitching four innings in relief in which he gave up one earned run while striking out two. Overall with the 2019 Mets, Mazza appeared in nine games, all in relief, compiling a 1–1 record with 5.51 ERA in  innings pitched while striking out 11 batters. Mazza was designated for assignment on December 13, 2019.

Boston Red Sox
The Boston Red Sox claimed Mazza off waivers on December 20, 2019. On March 26, 2020, the team optioned Mazza to the Class A-Advanced Salem Red Sox. He was added to Boston's active roster on July 29, and made his first appearance with the team on August 1 against the New York Yankees. He was optioned to the Red Sox' alternate training site after the game of August 5, as clubs reduced their 2020 active rosters to 28 players. He was recalled twice during August.

Overall with the 2020 Red Sox, Mazza appeared in nine games (six starts), compiling a 1–2 record with 4.80 ERA and 29 strikeouts in 30 innings pitched. His only victory of the season came on September 8, against the Philadelphia Phillies. He gave up the longest MLB home run of the season, a  shot to Ronald Acuña Jr. of the Atlanta Braves. On February 12, 2021, Mazza was designated for assignment after the signing of Martín Pérez.

Tampa Bay Rays
On February 17, 2021, the Red Sox traded Mazza and Jeffrey Springs to the Tampa Bay Rays in exchange for Ronaldo Hernández and Nick Sogard. On August 27, Mazza pitched the final 3 innings of a 6-3 victory over the Baltimore Orioles to earn his first career save. On November 5, Mazza was outrighted off of the 40-man roster and elected free agency. He re-signed with the Rays on a minor league contract on January 7, 2022, and was selected to the Rays' roster on April 7. 

On May 18, Mazza was placed on the 60-day injured list with a back injury. On June 20, 2022, he was reinstated from the 60-day injured list and was designated for assignment.

Seattle Mariners (second stint)
On June 28, 2022, the Seattle Mariners signed Mazza to a minor league deal. Mazza made 15 appearances (7 starts) for the Triple-A Tacoma Rainiers to close out the season. In 46.2 innings pitched, he recorded a 5-3 record and 7.75 ERA. He elected free agency following the season on November 10, 2022.

Saraperos de Saltillo
On March 13, 2023, Mazza signed with the Saraperos de Saltillo of the Mexican League.

Personal life
Mazza is related to Joe, Dom and Vince DiMaggio by way of his grandmother, who is a cousin of the DiMaggio brothers.

Mazza and his wife, Callie, married in November 2020. Their first child, a daughter, was born in February 2022.

References

External links

Menlo Oaks bio

1989 births
Living people
Sportspeople from Walnut Creek, California
Baseball players from California
Major League Baseball pitchers
New York Mets players
Boston Red Sox players
Tampa Bay Rays players
Menlo Oaks baseball players
Gulf Coast Twins players
Elizabethton Twins players
Cedar Rapids Kernels players
Gulf Coast Marlins players
Jupiter Hammerheads players
Jacksonville Suns players
Jacksonville Jumbo Shrimp players
New Orleans Baby Cakes players
San Rafael Pacifics players
Southern Maryland Blue Crabs players
Arkansas Travelers players
Binghamton Rumble Ponies players
Syracuse Mets players
Toros del Este players
American expatriate baseball players in the Dominican Republic
Durham Bulls players
Tacoma Rainiers players